Émile Bertrand Mbamba (born 27 October 1982 in Yaoundé) is a Cameroonian football striker, who currently plays for Indonesia Super League side Bhayangkara F.C. He also played for Vitesse Arnhem, Maccabi Tel Aviv, Maccabi Petah Tikva, Vitória Setúbal, Arema Malang, Daegu FC and Botev Plovdiv.

Club career

Vitesse
He was spotted at a youth tournament in France with the Cameroonian youth squad by Jan Streuer who brought him alongside Job Komol and Soné Masué Kallé in the Vitesse Arnhem youth-academy in The Netherlands in 1997. He played four years in the Eredivisie before he left for Israel in 2004.

Maccabi Tel-Aviv
Emile signed Maccabi Tel-aviv at the summer 2004.
His major achievement was the song that the fans made on him 
Mbamba not mbamba will not score a goal even if the goalkeeper fall.

Arema Malang
Mbamba scored his first goal for Arema Malang on 9 September 2007. In fact, he even scored two goals in that match against another Liga Indonesia contestant Deltras Sidoarjo.

Daegu FC
He was moved to Daegu FC on 24 February 2009 but made a 7 appearances after released on 30 June 2009.

Botev Plovdiv
On October 3, 2009, Mbamba signed a contract with Bulgarian Botev Plovdiv

Honours

Club
Maccabi Tel Aviv
 State Cup: 2004–05

References

External links 

1982 births
Living people
Cameroonian footballers
Cameroon under-20 international footballers
Association football forwards
SBV Vitesse players
Maccabi Tel Aviv F.C. players
Maccabi Petah Tikva F.C. players
Vitória F.C. players
Daegu FC players
Botev Plovdiv players
Eredivisie players
Primeira Liga players
Israeli Premier League players
K League 1 players
Cameroonian expatriate footballers
Cameroonian expatriate sportspeople in the Netherlands
Expatriate footballers in the Netherlands
Cameroonian expatriate sportspeople in Israel
Expatriate footballers in Israel
Cameroonian expatriate sportspeople in Portugal
Expatriate footballers in Portugal
Cameroonian expatriate sportspeople in Indonesia
Expatriate footballers in Indonesia
Expatriate footballers in South Korea
Footballers from Yaoundé